Hayward is a city in Sawyer County, Wisconsin, United States, next to the Namekagon River. The population was 2,318 at the 2010 census. It is the county seat of Sawyer County. The city is surrounded by the Town of Hayward.

History

Early history 
Hayward was "named for Anthony Judson Hayward, a lumberman who located the site for building a sawmill, around which the town grew."

Logging began in the late 1850s. Loggers came from Cortland County, New York, Carroll County, New Hampshire, Orange County, Vermont, Down East Maine in what is now Washington County, Maine and Hancock County, Maine. These were "Yankee" migrants, descended from the English Puritans who had settled New England during the 1600s. They were mostly members of the Congregational Church. From the 1890s, immigrants came from a variety of countries such as Germany, Norway, Poland, Italy, Ireland, Czechoslovakia, and Sweden.

Hayward Indian Residential School 
In 1901, the Hayward Indian Residential School was established in Hayward. It was founded to assimilate Indigenous children into white Christian American culture. Most of the students were Ojibwe and came from the Lac Courte Oreilles Reservation ten miles away from the school. The school operated until 1934, when it closed due to being understaffed, underfunded, and overcrowded. During its operation, thousands of students passed through the school. Some were taken forcibly from their families. At the school, children were forced to take on Christian names, cut their hair, wear military style uniforms, and march in military formations. Boys and girls were strictly segregated in separate buildings.

The curriculum focused on English language, Christian religion, and industrial labor. Provision of teachers was so poor that few students graduated, and graduation certificates were withheld from students who were thought likely to return to their reservations instead of assimilating into white society. The school was funded in part by the government and in part by the labor of the children in agriculture and sewing. Male children cleared over 260 acres for cultivation. Girls were trained as housewives and lived in the "Homestead Cottage", where a female teacher taught them how to run a household. The girls sold their sewing products to support the school and prepared meals for the other students. In the first decade of the school's operation, girls were encouraged to practice Native beadwork styles, but by 1910 this had discontinued.

Overcrowding and poor sanitation endangered the students' health. Dishes were rarely cleaned, students slept two to a bed, and during the winter they crowded into small rooms for indoor activities because there was no gymnasium. Children were served moldy bread, and most of the milk the children produced from the dairy herd was sold rather than fed to the children. These poor health conditions led to high rates of disease. The death rate during the 1918 flu pandemic was ten times higher than the Wisconsin average. Students also died from epidemics of measles and pneumonia. Some students were sexually abused by the teachers.

For speaking their Native languages, students were punished with beatings, public humiliation, extra chores, and confinement in the school jail. The school jail was a cell with bars in the basement of the boy's dormitory where children were fed only bread and water. Other students were punished by being forced to kneel on marbles for hours. Hayward students sometimes went out into the woods on the weekends and spoke Ojibwe together since it was forbidden in school. On one occasion, a secret drum dance was held, where students prepared by secretly sewing jingles onto their dresses and practicing their singing at night. The superintendents caught the students and punished them by burning their drums, hitting their knuckles, and forcing the girls to wear signs around their necks reading "I will not squaw dance". Due to the poor conditions and harsh discipline, runaways were common; in 1920 alone, 69 children ran away from the school.

The school closed in 1934 and was converted to the Hayward Area Memorial Hospital.

Geography 
Hayward is located at  (46.01, -91.480556).

Hayward is 71 miles southeast of Superior, 27 miles northeast of Spooner, about 107 miles north of Eau Claire, and 57 miles southwest of Ashland.

Climate

Demographics

2010 census 
As of the census of 2010, there were 2,318 people, 1,048 households, and 550 families residing in the city. The racial makeup of the city was 83.3% White, 0.4% African American, 11.8% Native American, 0.9% Asian, 0.3% from other races, and 3.2% from two or more races. Hispanic or Latino people of any race were 2.5% of the population.

There were 1,048 households, of which 27.6% had children under the age of 18 living with them, 32.5% were married couples living together, 14.0% had a female householder with no husband present, 5.9% had a male householder with no wife present, and 47.5% were non-families. 41.7% of all households were made up of individuals, and 20% had someone living alone who was 65 years of age or older. The average household size was 2.10 and the average family size was 2.80.

The median age in the city was 39.8 years. 23.7% of residents were under the age of 18; 8.5% were between the ages of 18 and 24; 23.6% were from 25 to 44; 23.5% were from 45 to 64; and 20.8% were 65 years of age or older. The gender makeup of the city was 47.5% male and 52.5% female.

2000 census 
As of the census of 2000, there were 2,129 people, 960 households, and 530 families residing in the city. The population density was 717.2 people per square mile (276.8/km2). There were 1,064 housing units at an average density of 358.4 per square mile (138.3/km2). The racial makeup of the city was 89.62% White, 0.14% Black or African American, 8.08% Native American, 0.66% Asian, 0.56% from other races, and 0.94% from two or more races. 0.85% of the population were Hispanic or Latino of any race.

There were 960 households, out of which 26.8% had children under the age of 18 living with them, 38.2% were married couples living together, 13.9% had a female householder with no husband present, and 44.8% were non-families. 39.8% of all households were made up of individuals, and 19.1% had someone living alone who was 65 years of age or older. The average household size was 2.09 and the average family size was 2.78.

In the city, the population was spread out, with 22.6% under the age of 18, 8.7% from 18 to 24, 25.5% from 25 to 44, 20.9% from 45 to 64, and 22.4% who were 65 years of age or older. The median age was 40 years. For every 100 females, there were 88.2 males. For every 100 females age 18 and over, there were 81.9 males.

The median income for a household in the city was $28,421, and the median income for a family was $36,287. Males had a median income of $30,174 versus $20,769 for females. The per capita income for the city was $16,658. About 10.6% of families and 14.5% of the population were below the poverty line, including 19.5% of those under age 18 and 7.1% of those age 65 or over.

Government
Hayward is the county seat of Sawyer County. The current mayor is Charlie Munich.

Transportation

Major highways
U.S. Highway 63, Wisconsin Highway 27, Wisconsin Highway 77, and County Highway B are the main routes in the community.

Bus 
Hayward has a public bus service, Namekagon Transit, which has three separate lines. Route 30 starts at Walmart and runs through the town with stops at Sawyer County Courthouse and Marketplace Foods, and then runs to the transfer center at the Sevenwinds Casino. Here one can transfer to or from Lines 40 or 60. Route 40 runs in a complete circuit route past Round Lake and to some other rural neighborhoods around the areas, and then arrives back at the transfer center. Route 60 runs south from the casino, making two stops, then diverging into two lines at the LCO Country Store. One heads on CTH-K, and eventually terminates in the North Woods Beach neighborhood; the other heads on CTH-E and terminates in the unincorporated community of Reserve. Namekagon Transit also has Door Stop Services in Sawyer, Barron, Washburn, and some parts of Bayfield counties.

Airport
Sawyer County Airport serves Hayward and the surrounding communities.

Tourism 

Hayward is a popular fishing destination because of the many lakes in the area, including Lac Courte Oreilles, Grindstone Lake, Round Lake, Moose Lake, Spider Lake, Windigo Lake, and the Chippewa Flowage, which are known for yielding trophy-sized muskellunge, northern pike, walleye, and smallmouth bass. It is also home to the "Quiet Lakes" (Teal, Ghost and Lost Land Lakes), which do not allow water sports.

The National Fresh Water Fishing Hall of Fame is in Hayward. It contains a  fiberglass musky, the world's largest fiberglass structure. Tourists can climb up into the fish's mouth and look over the town, as well as Lake Hayward. In addition to fishing, Hayward is also a hot spot for deer hunting, golfing, cross-country skiing, snowmobiling, canoeing, kayaking, horseback riding, and road and mountain biking. 

Sawyer County has over 600 miles of groomed snowmobile trails, including 335 miles that run through county forests and connect with trails in adjoining counties.

ATV (quad bikes) riding along county forest logging roads is permitted. There are 95.7 miles of state-funded ATV trails for winter use and 80.8 miles for summer use. State-owned trails include the Tuscobia Trail (51 miles), which runs from the Flambeau River to the western county line and the Dead Horse Connector (38 miles) in the eastern Flambeau Forest. The trail system also connects to 140 miles of trail within the Chequamegon National Forest. Hayward allows ATVs on some city roads.

The annual Chequamegon Fat Tire Festival is the nation's largest mass start mountain bike race. The first Fat Tire Festival was held in 1983 with 27 riders, and in 2008 the race was capped at 2,500 competitors. The two main races include the 40-mile "Chequamegon 40", and the 16-mile "Short and Fat."

Participants in the annual Lumberjack World Championships compete in a variety of lumberjack games such as log rolling, chopping, sawing, and chainsaw events.

Hayward hosts the American Birkebeiner cross-country skiing race, North America's largest cross-country ski marathon. The race started in 1973. No U.S. Ski Team members were in it, or any foreign skiers. It was unknown then. Now over 13,000 skiers race every year. It is one of Hayward's largest and most popular tourist attractions.

The Lac Courte Oreilles Band of Ojibwe host several powwows throughout the year. North America's largest powwow is held annually on the third weekend of July in Hayward. The Honor the Earth Powwow honors mother Earth and the Creator.

The Park Theatre is a performing arts center in Hayward, on Highway 63. It is operated by the Cable Hayward Area Arts Council (CHARAC). A variety of musical and artistic performances are presented throughout the year.

Hayward Wolfpack FC, an amateur soccer club, is based in Hayward. Founded in 2017, it competed in the Duluth Amateur Soccer League (DASL) in 2018. In 2019, the Wolfpack became a founding member of the Wisconsin Primary Amateur Soccer League (WPASL), a United States Adult Soccer Association and WSL-sanctioned league operating in western Wisconsin.

Media

Print 
 The Sawyer County Record is the local newspaper, published every Wednesday.

Radio 
 WBZH 910, owned by Zoe Communications
 WHSM-FM 101.1, owned by Zoe Communications
 WRLS-FM 92.3, owned by Vacationland Broadcasting
 WOJB-FM 88.9, owned by the Lac Courte Oreilles Band of Ojibwe

Television 
Stations received in Hayward that are from the Duluth area:

 3 KDLH (CW)
 6 KBJR (NBC/CBS)
 8 WDSE (PBS)
 10 WDIO (ABC)
 21 KQDS (FOX)

Education 
Hayward High School and Hayward Middle School serve the community. Lac Courte Oreilles Ojibwa Community College offers several degrees.

Sister city 
Hayward officially has one sister city:
 Lillehammer, Norway

Notable people 

 Fritz Ackley, MLB player
 Harry Blackmun, U.S. Supreme Court Justice; had a summer home on Spider Lake
 Al Capone, Chicago gangster; owned a hideaway-retreat near Hayward/Couderay in the 1920s and 1930s
 Nate DeLong, NBA player
 Jim Denomie, artist
 Sean Duffy, reality television star, ESPN commentator, U.S. House of Representatives, representing the 7th District of Wisconsin
 John H. Hellweg, Wisconsin state legislator and businessman
 Dan Plante, NHL player
 Daniel E. Riordan, Wisconsin State Senator
 Randy Sabien, musician/songwriter
 J. R. Salzman, world champion logroller

See also
 List of cities in Wisconsin

References

External links

 
 Hayward Area Chamber of Commerce
 Sawyer County Record – local newspaper
 Sanborn fire insurance maps: 1892 1898 1909

Cities in Wisconsin
Cities in Sawyer County, Wisconsin
County seats in Wisconsin